General Motors' Opel subsidiary in Europe designed a compact V6 engine with an unusual 54° vee angle. It was an iron block/aluminum head DOHC design with 4 valves per cylinder. All 54° engines were assembled at Ellesmere Port in England.

History

In the early 1990s, Opel identified the need for a modern, lightweight and compact power plant to replace its aging straight-six engine range. These engines have a cast iron engine block with cast aluminium alloy cylinder heads. The cylinder heads contain 4 valves per cylinder actuated by dual overhead camshafts which are driven by a timing belt. These engines however, differed from many modern V6 engines in that it has a 54 degree cylinder bank angle; as opposed to the more conventional 60 degree setup. This added to the engines' compactness which was needed to allow its use in front-wheel drive applications, as well as rear-wheel drive cars. Other features of these engines include: an oil to water heat exchanger is mounted within the V of the engine block, Bosch Motronic engine management system with full sequential fuel injection, knock control on each bank, Distributorless Ignition System (DIS), and closed loop lambda control.

Minor changes were made to the unit during its production, including an uprated oil pump around mid-1997, with the addition of larger oilways in the head machining (T-Vents), and modified valve lifters to reduce top-end valve noise, at which point the cam belt arrangement also changed with the lower idler moving. Around 1998, the spin-on metal canister oil filter was changed to a disposable paper element.

Revision

The engine was reworked substantially in 2000 in order to meet increasing emission requirements; with the 2.5 and 3.0 being replaced by lower compression 2.6 and 3.2 units. While displacement was changed the bore centers and deck height were retained. These later power plants had a revised engine management system setup, which used quad lambda sensor control, coil per plug ignition system and drive by wire throttles. The 3.2 also received a stronger steel crankshaft. As a result of these changes the EGR and secondary air injection system were removed.

Recalls

In its 3.0 L form, this engine was notable for recalls of all units installed in Cadillac Cateras due to timing belt tensioner bearing failures, which could cause catastrophic damage to the engine because of its interference design.

2.5

The C25XE or B258I has an  bore and stroke which displaces . It produces a Deutsches Institut für Normung (DIN) rated output of  @ 6,000 rpm, and generates  @ 3,200 rpm of torque. It was introduced in the Opel Vectra/Vauxhall Cavalier (both codenamed "Vectra-A") and Opel/Vauxhall Calibra. It features Bosch Motronic 2.8.1 engine management (omega) then M2.8.3 (calibra 1994, vectra 1995) in 1994 approx. and a compression ratio of 10.8:1.

For 1994, in order to meet more stringent emission requirements, a secondary air injection system, and an EGR valve were added to the C25XE and it became the X25XE. The exception being the 1997 Calibras, which, due to unavailability of C25XE engine blocks, were produced using the X25XE block but without modifications to the top end of the engine, and without addition of EGR. The X25XE also benefitted from higher volume oil pump. Firing order is 1-2-3-4-5-6

The breakdown of the engine name is as follows:

X - Exhaust Emissions Level: 94/12/EC, stage 2
25 - 2.5 Litre displacement
X - Compression Ratio - 10.0:1-11.5:1
E - Mixture System - Injection

Applications:
 Holden VS Commodore (export only)
 1993-1997 Opel Calibra
 1994-2000 Opel Omega B
 1993-1995 Opel Vectra A
 1995-2000 Opel Vectra B
 1993-1998 Saab 900
 1993-1995 Vauxhall Cavalier

MSD version
This engine appeared in two special edition Vauxhall Vectras, first the Vectra ST200 (Not the normal SuperTouring), and then the Vectra 2.5 GSi V6.

Applications:
 Vauxhall Vectra ST200
 Vauxhall Vectra 2.5 GSi

3.0

The X30XE, L81, B308I, or B308E has a  bore and stroke which displaces  with a compression ratio between 9.5:1 and 10.8:1. The B308E is a slightly modified X30XE used in the Saab 9-5. Engine management systems are Bosch Motronic M2.8.1, and later (approx. 2000) M2.8.3. Firing order is 1-2-3-4-5-6.

X - Exhaust Emissions Level: 94/12/EC, stage 2
30 - 3.0 Litre displacement
X - Compression Ratio - 10.0:1-11.5:1
E - Mixture System - Injection

Applications:
 1997–2001 Cadillac Catera
 1996–2000 Opel Sintra
 1995–2000 Opel Omega
 1995–1997 Saab 9000
 2000–2005 Saturn L-Series
 2002–2003 Saturn Vue

B308E
For 1997, Saab introduced a turbocharged version called the B308E for their 9-5 model. The engine was unique in that it used asymmetrical turbocharging; with the turbocharger driven by the exhaust gases from only one bank of cylinders. The engine was equipped with a special version of Saab Direct Ignition and used the Trionic T7 engine management system. This turbocharged version of the engine weighs 195 kg and uses the Saab Trionic T7 engine management system.

Applications:
 1997–2003 Saab 9-5

2.6

It was used in:

 Opel Omega B
 Opel Vectra B
 Cadillac CTS (Europe)

3.2

The  LA3 or Y32SE is a complete redesign of the L81 for the Cadillac CTS and Opel Omega B. It had fixed (non-variable) valve timing, and a variable length intake manifold. The engine has a  bore and stroke with a 10.0:1 compression ratio. Production started in July 2001, but the engine was replaced by the new GM High Feature engine starting in 2004.

This engine was used in:
 2003–2004 Cadillac CTS
 Opel Omega B
 Opel Vectra C
 Opel Signum

And last modification is Z32SE it is modified Y32SE with a 10.0:1 compression ratio and 155kW and 310Nm with Euro4 norm.
This engine was used in Europe:
 Opel Vectra C
 Opel Signum

References

See also
 List of GM factories
 List of GM engines

54-degree V6
V6 engines
Gasoline engines by model
https://www.clubcalibra.net/v6calibra/V6_Calibra_Guide.htm